Mildred Yvette Miller-Larche (born June 21, 1955) is an American lawyer and jurist who serves as a Judge on the Georgia Court of Appeals.

Education

Miller earned her Bachelor of Arts from Mercer University, graduating cum laude in 1977. She received her Juris Doctor from Mercer's Walter F. George School of Law in 1980. She also earned a Master of Laws in litigation from Emory University School of Law in 1988 and a Master of Laws in judicial process from the University of Virginia School of Law in 2004. She was admitted to the state bar on October 1, 1981.

Legal career

Miller began her career as an assistant district attorney for Fulton County. After this, she became the senior in-house litigation counsel for the Metropolitan Atlanta Rapid Transit Authority. She then worked as the part owner, general manager and general counsel for a Ford Lincoln-Mercury car dealership. During this time, Miller also maintained a private legal practice. In 1989, she became a judge for the first time, serving as an administrative law judge for the State Board of Workers’ Compensation. Then in 1992 she was appointed to the position of director and judge of the Appellate Division of the State Board of Workers’ Compensation. In 1996, she was appointed to the Fulton County State Court, where she served as judge until her appointment to the Georgia Court of Appeals in 1999.

Service on Georgia Court of Appeals

She was appointed to the Georgia Court of Appeals on July 12, 1999 by Governor Roy Barnes and became the 65th Judge on the court. She is the first African-American woman to serve on the Court as well as the first African-American woman to serve as the Court's Chief Judge. Miller was elected to the court in 2000 and re-elected in 2006, 2012, and 2018. She served as chief judge from January 1, 2009, to January 1, 2011. She was sworn in a Chief Judge on January 6, 2009.

Consideration for Supreme Court of Georgia

Miller's name was among those being considered for a seat on the Supreme Court of Georgia, which ultimately went to Michael P. Boggs.

References

External links

Living people
1955 births
People from Macon, Georgia
20th-century American judges
20th-century American lawyers
21st-century American judges
African-American judges
African-American lawyers
Emory University School of Law alumni
Georgia Court of Appeals judges
Mercer University alumni
University of Virginia School of Law alumni
20th-century American women lawyers
20th-century American women judges
21st-century American women judges
20th-century African-American women
20th-century African-American people
21st-century African-American women
21st-century African-American people